Dinosaur Bones are a Canadian indie rock band formed in 2008 in Toronto consisting of songwriter/vocalist/guitarist Ben Fox, bassist Branko Scekic, keyboardist David Wickland, drummer Lucas Fredette, and guitarist Josh Byrne.

Biography 
Dinosaur Bones formed in late 2007 and began performing in early 2008.  They recorded and independently released a self-titled EP in May 2008 and began touring locally.  The four-song effort was enough to garner two XM Verge Music Award nominations, for Album of the Year and Artist of the Year.   In October 2010, Dinosaur Bones signed an international record deal with Canadian independent record label Dine Alone Records (City & Colour, Tokyo Police Club, Alexisonfire).   Their Birthright EP, released a month later,  marked the band's first release on Dine Alone Records.  And on March 8, 2010, the band released their first full-length album, My Divider.   The album was met with consistently-strong reviews, including Montreal's Hour magazine proclaiming: "These 11 tracks are emotional and gripping, and show the band as a tight, whole artistic unit with a signature sound."  Both the Birthright EP and My Divider were produced by Jon Drew, whose production credits include Arkells, Tokyo Police Club, and Fucked Up.

Performance History

Live Performance 
Dinosaur Bones have shared the stage with such artists as Broken Social Scene, Sloan, White Lies, Warpaint, The Weakerthans, and Handsome Furs, and have toured extensively both in Canada and the United States, including tours supporting Tokyo Police Club, Ra Ra Riot, Arkells, and Hollerado.

Since forming, the band has made multiple appearances at Canadian festivals such as Pop Montreal, North By Northeast, Canadian Music Week,  and Halifax Pop Explosion.     In 2011, the band was invited to perform on the main stage of both Rifflandia Music Festival in Victoria, British Columbia, and Edgefest in Toronto, Ontario.  Dinosaur Bones have also made multiple appearances at American festivals, including CMJ Music Marathon, and South By Southwest in 2010, where the then-unsigned band were invited to play the Billboard Magazine showcase.  The band returned to the festival in 2011 in support of My Divider.

Television Performances 
Dinosaur Bones have made three television appearances, performing live on Winnipeg's Breakfast Television, Ottawa's A-Channel Morning, as well as appearing for a three-song performance on MTV Live.

Discography

Albums

EPs

Singles

References 
Citations

External links 
Dinosaur Bones Official Website
Dinosaur Bones On Twitter
Dinosaur Bones On Facebook
Dinosaur Bones On Myspace

Musical groups established in 2008
Musical groups from Toronto
Canadian indie rock groups
Dine Alone Records artists
2008 establishments in Ontario